James F. P. Johnson (January 25, 1835 – February 12, 1906) was a member of the Florida House of Representatives from Brevard County in the 1864 session. He was a delegate to the Florida Constitutional Convention of 1865.

He was born in South Carolina on January 25, 1835, the son of Abner D. Johnson and Frances R. Pickett.

See also 
 List of members of the Florida House of Representatives from Brevard County, Florida

References 

1906 deaths
1835 births
American people of the Seminole Wars
Confederate States Army soldiers
Members of the Florida House of Representatives
People from Brevard County, Florida
People from South Carolina
19th-century American politicians